Soe Min Wimala Dewi was a queen consort of King Binnya Ran I of Hanthawaddy. Soe Min was of Ava royalty, and was given to Binnya Ran in a marriage of state in 1431. Her title at Pegu was Thiri Pawara Maha Dhamma Yaza Dewi. She was the mother of King Leik Munhtaw of Hanthawaddy.

Ancestry
Soe Min was born to Saw Min Pu and Gov. Thinkhaya of Pagan (Bagan). She was a half cousin as well as niece of King Minkhaung I of Ava although she was about four decades younger. Her eldest sibling Saw Shwe Khet was viceroy of Prome (Pyay). Her younger sister Atula Thiri Maha Yaza Dewi was the chief queen of King Narapati I of Ava.

Notes

References

Bibliography
 

Ava dynasty
Hanthawaddy dynasty